Song for My Daughter is an album by American jazz pianist Jack Wilson featuring performances recorded in 1968 and 1969 and released on the Blue Note label.

Reception
The Allmusic review by Stephen Thomas Erlewine awarded the album 3 stars and stated "Like many of his peers on the label, Wilson pursued a pop direction as the '60s drew to a close, which meant he covered pop hits... Although the production has dated somewhat, it remains a pleasant artifact of its time, and fans of that sound should search for it".

Track listing
All compositions by Jack Wilson except as indicated
 "Imagine"
 "Herman's Helmet"
 "Changing with the Times" 
 "Night Creature" (Duke Ellington)
 "Scarborough Fair/Canticle" (Traditional) 		
 "Song for My Daughter" 		
 "Eighty-One" (Ron Carter) 		
 "Se Todos Fossem Iguais a Você" (Antonio Carlos Jobim) 	
 "Stormy" (Buddy Buie, James Cobb)  		
 "Soft Summer Rain" (David Baker)
Recorded at Liberty Studios in West Hollywood, California on September 28, 1968 (tracks 1, 3 & 8), December 16, 1968 (tracks 2, 4 & 7), April 23, 1969 (track 10), June 19, 1969 (track 5), June 21 & 26, 1969 (tracks 6 & 9).

Personnel
Jack Wilson – piano 
Stan Levey – vibes, shaker (tracks 1, 3 & 8)
Victor Feldman – vibes, timpani (tracks 2, 4 & 7)
Tommy Vig – vibes (track 10)  
John Gray (tracks 1, 3 & 8), Howard Roberts (tracks 2, 4, 7 & 10) – guitar
Ray Brown (tracks 1, 3, 8 & 10), Ike Issacs (track 5 & 9), Andrew Simpkins (tracks 2, 4 & 7) – bass
Donald Bailey (tracks 5, 9 & 10), Varney Barlow (tracks 1, 3 & 8), Jimmie Smith (tracks 2, 4 & 7) – drums
Billy Byers – arranger, conductor (tracks 1–4 & 6–9)
Unidentified strings

References

Blue Note Records albums
Jack Wilson (jazz pianist) albums
1969 albums
Albums conducted by Billy Blyers
Albums arranged by Billy Blyers